The Democratic Party is a constitutional populist political party in Indonesia. It was founded on 9 September 2001. Its ideology is based on the Indonesian concept of Pancasila.

Origins
The 2001 Special Session of the People's Consultative Assembly which resulted in Megawati Sukarnoputri's election as president of Indonesia caused a vacancy in the position of vice president. Susilo Bambang Yudhoyono was one candidate who competed for the vice presidency, losing out to Hamzah Haz.

Yudhoyono's supporters saw Yudhoyono's participation in the vice presidential election as a sign of his popularity and recognized Yudhoyono's potential as a possible leader for Indonesia. One of these supporters, Vence Rumangkang, approached Yudhoyono with the idea of forming a political party to help shore up support for the 2004 presidential elections. Yudhoyono approved of the idea and, after going through the basic concepts, left Rumangkang in charge of forming the party.

From 12 to 19 August 2001, Rumangkang began holding a series of meetings to discuss the formation of the party while holding consultations with Yudhoyono, who was now serving as the coordinating minister for Politics and Security. Yudhoyono personally led the meeting on 19 August and on 20 August 2001, the basic outline of the party was finalized.

On 9 September 2001 (Yudhoyono's 52nd birthday), the formation of the Democratic Party was officially declared and on 10 September 2001, it was registered at the Ministry of Law and Human Rights. The party also elected Subur Budhisantoso as party chairman.

History

2004 legislative election
The party won 7.5% share of votes and won 57 out of 560 seats in the People's Representative Council in the 2004 legislative election and finished in fifth place overall.

2004 presidential election 
The party nominated Yudhoyono as its presidential candidate, with Jusuf Kalla as the vice presidential candidate. In this, they were also supported by the Crescent Star Party and Indonesian Justice and Unity Party. Yudhoyono and Kalla won the first round of elections in July 2004 with 33.6% of the votes and would go on to win 60.1% in the run-offs, thereby securing Yudhoyono's election as president.

2005 party congress
In May 2005, the party held its first party congress, during which Hadi Utomo was elected as chairman. Nevertheless, the highest authority in the Party remained with Yudhoyono, who was elected was chairman of the Advisory Board.

2009 legislative election
The party came first in the 2009 legislative election with 20.9 percent of the votes, making it the largest party in the People's Representative Council, with 148 seats, just over one quarter of the total.

2009 presidential election 
Incumbent Yudhoyono won the election, with former governor of Bank Indonesia, Boediono, as vice presidential candidate, with a total tally of 60.8% in first round of runoff system election, beating former president Megawati and incumbent vice-president Kalla.

2013 extraordinary congress
After the resignation of Anas Urbaningrum, the party held an extraordinary congress on 30 March 2013 in Bali to fill the chairmanship. Yudhoyono ran unopposed and was unanimously elected after no other party members decided to run.

2014 legislative election
For the 2014 legislative election, the party set a target of 15% of the national vote, less than its 2009 share. One reason the party expected its vote to fall was that Yudhoyono would not able to run for president, having served the two terms allowed for in the constitution. However, the party won only 10.19%, losing over half of its seats in the legislature.

2019 legislative election 
For the 2019 legislative election, the party initially set a target of 15%, but later changed the target to 10% of the national vote. The party managed to gain 7.77% of the vote, losing some seats in the legislature.

2020 party congress 
On 15 March 2020, Agus Harimurti Yudhoyono, after commanding the Joint Task Command (Kogasma) during the 2019 general election, is elected to be the new general chairman of the Party, replacing his father as the chairman.

2021 internal conflict 
On 5 March 2021, an extraordinary congress that is held by some of the Democratic Party members decided to elect Moeldoko as the new general chairman of the party, contrary to the results of 2020 Democratic Party Congress that elected Agus Harimurti Yudhoyono as the general chairman until 2025.

The election of the extraordinary congress is heavily opposed by former General Chairman Susilo Bambang Yudhoyono (SBY), stating that the extraordinary congress is unlawful as they have to be held by the request of the upper house of the party, and none of the upper house members of the party have requested any extraordinary congress. SBY also stated that extraordinary congress have to be requested by at least 2/3 of the party's regional representative council, and none of the regional representative council have requested the extraordinary congress.

Agus Harimurti Yudhoyono claimed that the election of Moeldoko is illegal, and he is the legitimate leader of the party.

On 31 March 2021 the government decided that the result of the extraordinary congress is illegitimate, confirming that Agus Yudhoyono is the legitimate chairman of the Democratic Party.

Chairpersons
Subur Budhisantoso (2001 – 2005)
Hadi Utomo (2005 – 23 May 2010)
Anas Urbaningrum (23 May 2010 – 23 February 2013)
Susilo Bambang Yudhoyono (30 March 2013 - 15 March 2020)
Agus Harimurti Yudhoyono (15 March 2020 – Present), disputed, elected by 2020 Democratic Party congress.

Corruption cases
Muhammad Nazaruddin was dismissed by the Democratic Party's ethics council from his position as party treasurer in May 2011 due to his involvement in a corruption case, but he remained a legislator in the House of Representatives. Constitutional Court chief Mahfud MD said Nazaruddin had given S$120,000 ($96,900) to Constitutional Court secretary general Janedri M. Gaffar in 2010. The money was later returned to Nazaruddin. On 24 May 2011, Mahfud reported Nazaruddin to the Corruption Eradication Commission for allegedly trying to bribe a court official.

On 20 April 2012, Nazaruddin was convicted of corruption and sentenced to four years and 10 months in prison and fined approximately US$22,000. He was found guilty of accepting over 4.68 billion rupiah in return for helping rig the tenders for an athletes' village built for the Southeast Asian Games in South Sumatra in November 2011.

Nazaruddin was arrested by Interpol in Cartagena, Colombia in August 2011, having fled Indonesia after being named a suspect in the case.

The Nazaruddin scandal was followed by the naming of a number of high-ranking party officials and legislators as suspects in numerous graft cases. Most prominent among them was Youth and Sports Minister Andi Mallarangeng, who resigned in December 2012. Mallarangeng was named suspect in the same athlete training camp case which had involved Nazaruddin. Business tycoon Siti Hartati Murdaya, who had served on the party's Advisory Board, resigned in August 2012 after becoming embroiled in a corruption case for which she was later jailed.

Election results

Legislative election results

Presidential election results

Note: Bold text indicates the party member

References

2001 establishments in Indonesia
Centrist parties in Asia
Pancasila political parties
Political parties established in 2001
Political parties in Indonesia